The Linkou Power Plant is a coal-fired power plant in Linkou District, New Taipei, Taiwan. With the previous total installed capacity of 600 MW, the power plant used to be the smallest coal-fired power plant in Taiwan. The power plant is currently undergoing retrofitting to increase its installed generation capacity to 2.4 GW.

Events

1968
The power plant began its operation on 18 July 1968 after a successful train run of its first 300 MW giant electric generator which started two weeks before.

2014
On 1 September 2014, the current two unit generators were decommissioned.

2016
On 6 October 2016, the plant completed its refurbishment of its old two units and commissioned the new one supercritical unit of 800 MW.

2017
On 24 March 2017, the second of the 800 MW unit was commissioned.

2019
One 800 MW ultra supercritical coal-fired unit has been built by Mitsubishi Heavy Industries and CTCI Corporation at the plant. On 24 October 2019, the third unit was commissioned.

Transportation
Linkou Power Plant is accessible north of Shanbi Station of Taoyuan Metro.

See also

 List of power stations in Taiwan
 Electricity sector in Taiwan

References

1968 establishments in Taiwan
Buildings and structures in New Taipei
Coal-fired power stations in Taiwan
Energy infrastructure completed in 1968